Geoffrey Heneage Drummond, VC (25 January 1886 – 21 April 1941) was a British land agent, businessman, sailor, and a recipient of the Victoria Cross, the highest award for gallantry in the face of the enemy that can be awarded to British and Commonwealth forces.

Early life and First World War
Drummond was born on 25 January 1886. He was 32 years old, and a lieutenant in the Royal Naval Volunteer Reserve during the First World War, and was awarded the VC for his part in the Second Ostend Raid.

On 9/10 May 1918 at Ostend, Belgium, Lieutenant Drummond commanding HMML (Motor Launch) 254, volunteered for rescue work and was following HMS Vindictive to the harbour when a shell burst on board killing an officer and a deck hand and badly wounding the coxswain and Lieutenant Drummond. Notwithstanding his wounds, this officer brought M.L. 254 alongside Vindictive and then took off two officers and 38 men, some of whom were killed or wounded while embarking. He retained consciousness long enough to back his vessel away from the piers and towards the open sea before collapsing exhausted from his wounds.

Post-war
Drummond married Maude Aylmer Tindal Bosanquet (d 27 Sept, 1967) on 2 July 1918.

Despite suffering from his severe wounds received in his VC action, Drummond served with the Royal Naval Patrol Service in the Second World War.

Drummond died on 21 April 1941 from a fall. His VC is on display in the Lord Ashcroft Gallery at the Imperial War Museum, London.

References

External links
Location of grave and VC medal (Buckinghamshire)

1886 births
1941 deaths
British World War I recipients of the Victoria Cross
Royal Navy officers
Royal Navy recipients of the Victoria Cross
Royal Naval Volunteer Reserve personnel of World War I
Royal Navy personnel of World War II
Recipients of the Legion of Honour
Accidental deaths from falls
People from the City of Westminster
People educated at Clayesmore School